Arcadia is a ghost town in Issaquena County, Mississippi, United States.

Arcadia was a postal town located on the Mississippi River. It had a population of 45 in 1900.

A post office operated under the name Arcadia from 1882 to 1919.

The former community is today called "Arcadia Point", and is located on the east side of an uninhabited island within the Mississippi River.

References

Former populated places in Issaquena County, Mississippi
Mississippi populated places on the Mississippi River
Former populated places in Mississippi